Robert Alan Lock (born May 22, 1966) is an American former professional basketball player. Lock was born and raised in Reedley, California and played collegiate ball with the University of Kentucky (1984–1988) where he was a solid contributor off the bench and increased his stats every year he played. He entered the 1988 NBA draft and was picked 51st in the third round by the Los Angeles Clippers; however, Lock accepted an offer to play in Italy instead. He did eventually return to play for just 20 games with Clippers during the latter part of the 1988-89 NBA season.

After retiring from basketball, Lock pursued his childhood dream of becoming a pilot. He is currently the owner of Waldo Wright's Flying Service where he gives open cockpit rides to visitors in restored vintage biplanes. The family business is based in Polk City, Florida and is currently the largest provider of open cockpit flights.

References

External links
 Waldo Wright's Flying Service

1966 births
Living people
American expatriate basketball people in France
American expatriate basketball people in Italy
American expatriate basketball people in Spain
American men's basketball players
Basketball players from California
CB Girona players
Kentucky Wildcats men's basketball players
Liga ACB players
Limoges CSP players
Los Angeles Clippers draft picks
Los Angeles Clippers players
Montecatiniterme Basketball players
Pallacanestro Pavia players
Parade High School All-Americans (boys' basketball)
People from Reedley, California
Power forwards (basketball)
Sportspeople from Fresno County, California
Viola Reggio Calabria players